Medicals RFC is a rugby union club in Newcastle Upon Tyne who have been in existence since 1898. They currently play in the Durham/Northumberland 1 league having been promoted from Durham/Northumberland 2 in the 2009-10 season.

Medicals RFC are most famous for the 1995-6 side that reached the final of the RFU Pilkington Shield at Twickenham and won the trophy – beating Helston RFC, Cornwall 16 v 6.

The uniform of the Club is maroon jerseys with white collars, white shorts and maroon stockings with white tops.

Medicals RFC History
The club was formed in 1898 as the Durham University College of Medicine R.F.C. Medicals RFC was then elected a senior member of the Northumberland Rugby Union in 1920.

A Junior Club between 1934 and 1937 when they were again elected a Senior Member of the N.R.U. They were Northumberland Senior Cup Winners in 1922, 1923, 1952 and 1953.

Club Honours
Pilkington Shield winners: 1996
Northumberland Senior Cup winners (4): 1922, 1923, 1952, 1953
Northumberland Senior Plate winners (2): 2012, 2022
Durham/Northumberland 1 champions: 1998–99
Durham/Northumberland 3 champions: 2006–07

Notable players
The Club has produced five Internationals:

 Dr EE. Chapman, 1910-14. (The first man to score a try and kick a goal at Twickenham)
 Dr R. Armstrong, 1924.
 Dr Stephen Peel, a wartime cap.
 W.G.D. Morgan, 1960-61.
 O.W.N. Caplan 1978.

Trialists also include Dr G.C.Taylor, Mr G. Scott-Page and Dr Maurice Jones.

RFU Presidents
Medicals RFC also has the honour and distinction of having two members elected to the position of President of the RFU
 Mr D.D.Serfontein, 1992-1993.
 Mr W.G.D. Morgan 2002-2003

Pilkington Shield (1996)
The finest hour of the club's achievement was on 4 May 1996 Twickenham, winners of the National Junior Club Knock-out Competition, The Pilkington Shield.
Medicals RFC beat Helston RFC (Cornwall) by 16 points to 6.

Current Information
Currently, Medicals RFC play in Durham/Northumberland 1. Recently Medicals RFC have been successful within the Durham & Northumberland league competitions:

English rugby union teams
University and college rugby union clubs in England
Rugby clubs established in 1898
1898 establishments in England